Hockering Wood is an  biological Site of Special Scientific Interest east of Dereham in Norfolk.

This is one of the largest areas of ancient, semi-natural woodland in the county. It has many rare species, especially of  bryophytes, and there are ponds which have populations of great crested newts, a protected species under the Wildlife and Countryside Act 1981.

The site is private with public access.

References

Sites of Special Scientific Interest in Norfolk